SiriusXMU (formerly XMU, and known as Sirius U on Sirius Canada, although Sirius receivers list it as Sirius XM U) is an indie pop, indie rock, unsigned artist music channel on XM Satellite Radio channel 35 (previously 43).

On November 12, 2008, it was added to Sirius 26 (replacing the Left of Center channel), moving to Sirius 35 on May 4, 2011, and Dish Network channel 6026. Until February 9, 2010, it was on DirecTV channel 831. The XM DJs were replaced with Sirius DJs, and acquired its current name, even though the channel is still listed as X043-FM by Mediabase. Sirius XM describes the channel as "North America's Indie Rock Station" and primarily airs artists who are signed to independent labels. The channel frequently plays songs from an artist's full album instead of just the singles. The Wall Street Journal has described XMU as "XM's alternative-music channel".

From July 15 to July 25 of 2020, XMU temporarily became the Beastie Boys Channel as one of many limited-run stations devoted to a specific artist.

Featured shows
 Blog Radio (Carles.buzz, My Old Kentucky Blog, BrooklynVegan, Gorilla vs. Bear, Aquarium Drunkard, Coconut Radio)
 SiriusXMU Download 15
 SiriusXMU Sessions (formerly "Left of Sessions" prior to the Sirius/XM merger and was on the former channel Left of Center)
 SiriusXMU Old School Show

DJs

Active DJs
, active DJs  on the channel include:
 Jenny Eliscu
 Josiah Lambert
 JaRon
 Nick Masi
 Justin Gage
 Carles
 Dodge
 Phoebe Bridgers
 Chris Muckley

Former DJs

 The station once featured DJ's Billy Zero and Tobi. Both were released from XM upon the launch of the merged Sirius-XM lineup.
 Christopher the Minister left Sirius on November 14, 2008, after six and a half years as a DJ on (formerly) Left of Center and Alt Nation.
 Jake Fogelnest left Sirius in November, 2014, to pursue a TV writing career.
 Julia Cunningham left the channel on October 30, 2020, after 13 years and moved to PopRocks.

Core artists
Tame Impala
LCD Soundsystem
Phoebe Bridgers
Yeah Yeah Yeahs
Radiohead
Beach House
Fleet Foxes
Clairo
Perfume Genius
The Decemberists
Arctic Monkeys

References

External links
 

Sirius Satellite Radio channels
XM Satellite Radio channels
Sirius XM Radio channels
Radio stations established in 2001